is a  manga series written and illustrated by Fumi Yoshinaga. The slice of life series focuses on the relationship between Shiro Kakei and Kenji Yabuki, a middle-aged gay couple living in Tokyo, Japan.

The series premiered in 2007, and is serialized by Kodansha in the manga magazine Weekly Morning. It has also been collected in  volumes, published by Kodansha in Japan since 2007 and by Vertical in North America since 2014; nineteen volumes have been released in Japanese, and fourteen in English.

Volume list

References

External links
 What Did You Eat Yesterday? official manga website 
 What Did You Eat Yesterday? official manga blog (inactive) 

What Did You Eat Yesterday? chapters